Herlyn Ysrael Zúñiga Yáñez (born August 27, 1976) is a Peruvian former footballer who has played as a striker for Peru and for clubs including Coventry City, Estudiantes and Melgar. Since retirement, Zúñiga has reverted to dentistry in his homeland, for which he obtained qualifications for concurrently during his tenure at Sporting Cristal.

Club career
Zúñiga initially trained as a dental technician before deciding to become a professional footballer at the relatively late age of 22. He gained some international fame after scoring a league-record equalling 32 goals for Melgar in his first season in the Primera División Peruana in 1999. His goalscoring success prompted English Premier League club Coventry City to purchase him for £750,000 in February 2000. However, he was unable to find any form in England; scoring three goals in 30 appearances spread over two and a half years with Coventry before he was released in the summer of 2002.

After leaving Coventry he joined Argentine club Estudiantes, but again struggled to recapture his scoring form. Zúñiga returned to his homeland following the conclusion of his spell in Argentina to join Sporting Cristal, a club he spent time at as a teenager before leaving the game to study to be a dental worker.

International career
He won 22 caps and scored 3 goals for the Peru.

He was recalled against Ecuador in June 2007.

International
As of 9 July 2007

Honours

Club 
Guardia Republicana
 Peruvian Segunda División:1995
Sporting Cristal
 Peruvian Primera División: 2005
Juan Aurich
 Peruvian First Division: 2011
FBC Melgar
 Peruvian First Division: 2015

References

External links

1976 births
Living people
Footballers from Lima
Association football forwards
Peruvian footballers
Peru international footballers
Coronel Bolognesi footballers
FBC Melgar footballers
Coventry City F.C. players
Estudiantes de La Plata footballers
Cruz Azul footballers
Club Universitario de Deportes footballers
Atlético Universidad footballers
Sporting Cristal footballers
Bursaspor footballers
Juan Aurich footballers
Copa Perú players
Peruvian Primera División players
Peruvian Segunda División players
Premier League players
Argentine Primera División players
Süper Lig players
1999 Copa América players
2000 CONCACAF Gold Cup players
2007 Copa América players
Peruvian expatriate footballers
Expatriate footballers in England
Expatriate footballers in Argentina
Expatriate footballers in Turkey